Kaslik is a Maronite town in the Keserwan District of the   Keserwan-Jbeil Governorate in Lebanon. The town is home to a variety of 18th-century limestone houses, and a number of historic churches. However, the area was also subject to the rampant development during the Lebanese economic boom of the mid-twentieth century and has become heavily urbanized and now features a variety of factories and industrial plants within its borders.

Kaslik is today a hub for fishing and leisure ports as well as resorts, hotels, beaches and a shopping area. The town is also home to the USEK University and to international restaurants and cafes.

References 

Populated places in Keserwan District
Maronite Christian communities in Lebanon